Ortatepe can refer to:

 Ortatepe, İliç
 Ortatepe, Kale